Mieczysław Jastrun born Mojsze Agatstein (29 October 1903 – 22 February 1983) was a Polish poet and essayist of Jewish origin. The main themes of his poetry are philosophy and morality. He translated French, Russian, and German poetry to Polish.

Life 
Jastrun was born in Korolivka, Borshchiv Raion (in the former Eastern Galicia) into a Jewish family, the son of Józef Agatstein and Maria Agatstein née Wiensohn. He spent his childhood in Jodłowa, and went to public school in Ryglice, where his father had opened a surgery. The family moved several times to places where Joseph worked. Through 1915−1919 Mieczysław stayed in Kraków, where he went to gymnasium. Due to the onset of Polish–Soviet War he interrupted his studies and volunteered to the Polish Army. However, he did not participate in engagements as he contracted typhus. On 9 March 1920 together with his older brother, Jerzy Stanisław (later Jerzy Gierowski) he was baptised in the parish church in Jodłowa. He did not return to Kraków immediately and instead completed the last two high school forms in First General Liceum in Tarnów. During that time he lived in Pleśna, with his former governess (1921−1923).

Later during the 1920s, Jastrun studied Polish, German and philosophy at the Jagiellonian University in Kraków; he received a doctorate in 1929. He was also close to the Skamander group and wrote several works of poetry strongly influenced by symbolism. At the onset of World War II, Jastrun took refuge in Lviv, then occupied by the Soviet Union, where he worked as a teacher. After Nazi Germany occupied Lviv in 1941, he relocated to Warsaw, took the name Jan Klonowicz and worked as an underground teacher. Jastrun's Jewish identity remained undiscovered during the war, and he survived the Holocaust.

After the end of the war, Jastrun lived briefly in Lublin and Lodz before moving back to Warsaw in 1949. He joined the communist Polish United Workers' Party (PZPR), and in the post-war era wrote several books dealing with the Nazi occupation and the Holocaust in the style of socialist realism. Jastrun also wrote biographies of Jan Kochanowski, Adam Mickiewicz and Juliusz Słowacki, translated works by poets such as Lorca, Pushkin, Hölderlin and Rilke into Polish, and taught modern poetry at the University of Warsaw.

In 1964 he was one of the signatories of the so-called Letter of 34 to Prime Minister Józef Cyrankiewicz regarding freedom of culture.

Jastrun died in Warsaw in 1983, and is buried at Powązki Cemetery.

References

External links
Mieczyslaw Jastrun
Here Too as in Jerusalem

1903 births
1983 deaths
20th-century Polish Jews
Burials at Powązki Cemetery
20th-century Polish poets
Recipients of the State Award Badge (Poland)